A general election was scheduled in the U.S. state of Idaho on November 8, 2022. All of Idaho's executive officers were up for election as well as both of Idaho's two seats in the United States House of Representatives and one United States Senate seat.

See also 

 2022 United States House of Representatives elections in Idaho
 2022 Idaho gubernatorial election
 2022 Idaho lieutenant gubernatorial election
 2022 United States Senate election in Idaho
 2022 Idaho House of Representatives election
 2022 Idaho Senate election
 2022 Idaho Secretary of State election
 2022 Idaho Attorney General election
 2022 Idaho State Treasurer election

References 
 
Idaho